Zamia lindenii is a species of cycad in the family Zamiaceae.

References

Whitelock, Loran M. 2002. The Cycads. Portland: Timber Press.

External links
 
 

lindenii